Gal or Gal Costa is the second album by Brazilian singer Gal Costa, released months after the first album Gal Costa. To distinguish it from Costa's previous release, the album is sometimes referred to as Cinema Olympia, the title of its first track. It is considered by the public and critics alike as her most psychedelic and experimental album. The music in the album has been considered unprecedented. Andy Beta of The Pitchfork Review described the album as "the equivalent of Barbra Streisand recording with Boredoms" and "one of the heaviest documents of Tropicália."

Track listing

References 

1969 albums
Gal Costa albums